Vattathukkul Chaduram is a 1978 Indian Tamil-language film, directed by S. P. Muthuraman and produced by N. S. Mani. Based on the novel written by Maharishi, the film stars Latha, Sumithra, Srikanth and Sarath Babu. It depicts the depth of friendship shared between the characters Anu and Malathy. The film was released on 29 July 1978, and Latha won the Filmfare Award for Best Actress – Tamil.

Plot 

Anu falls in love with Karthik, the brother of her best friend Malathy from childhood. Karthik doesn't like her, since she was born out of wedlock. Malathy has always done well in school and wishes to continue studying further. Kartik and Malathy's mother tries to get her married. Anu suggests that she could take her along to Chennai, where she could continue studying while Anu pursues a dancing career. Anu has to compromise and get along with her hotel managers to get a dancing contract to earn money to educate Malathy. Meanwhile, Malathy's fiancée doesn't approve of her friendship with a club dancer, and asks Malathy to cut Anu out of her life. Though Malathy doesn't approve of her friend's way of earning a living, she cannot throw away 15 years of friendship. Malathy decides to cancel the marriage proposal in order to save her friendship. Anu goes to extreme measures to save her friend's love life.

Cast 

Latha as Anu
Sumithra as Malathy
Srikanth as Karthik
Sarath Babu
Thengai Srinivasan
V. Gopalakrishnan
Savitri
C. K. Saraswathi
Udayalakshmi
Baby Sumathi
Baby Indira
Master Sunil Kumar
Karuppiah
Ceylon Manohar
Narayanan
Natarajan
Jothi Shanmugam
Rajaram
Panikkar

Soundtrack 
The music was composed by Ilaiyaraaja, with lyrics by Panchu Arunachalam. The song "Kaadhal Ennum Kaaviyam" is set to the raga Panthuravali, and "Idho Idho En Nenjile" is set to Mayamalavagowla.

References

Bibliography

External links 
 

1970s Tamil-language films
1978 films
Films about friendship
Films based on Indian novels
Films directed by S. P. Muthuraman
Films scored by Ilaiyaraaja
Films with screenplays by Panchu Arunachalam